TikTok Dabloons or TikTok Doubloons are a fictional currency and internet trend on TikTok which started circulating around the social platform in November 2022. The "currency" circulates around the app using photo slideshows containing a cat offering it to the user, as well as cat "merchants" selling fictional food, housing, clothing, etc., which can be bought using the currency using an "honor system" making the users track their net worth through various methods such as writing on a whiteboard, notebooks, and spreadsheets. It also has its own fictional economy which has "dabloon" counterparts of the IRS and government to control "dabloon inflation".

Etymology

The word "dabloon" comes from a purposeful misspelling of the former currency called a "doubloon", a Spanish gold coin worth around four Spanish dollars.

History
The trend's origins can be traced back to two images posted on Instagram around April 2021 by user catz.jpeg of a cat's paw with the caption "4 dabloons" and a black cat with an outstretched paw with the same caption.

By October 2022, "But it will cost you 4 dabloons", a phrase containing the caption became popular on TikTok via slideshows containing the sale of fictional items using the currency and by late November the trend exploded in popularity in the social platform with thousands of accounts posting content with the fictional currency. Videos using the hashtag #dabloons collectively gained nearly 800 million views, whilst its singular counterpart #dabloon collectively gained more than 400 million views as of the 28th of November 2022.

References

External links

2020s fads and trends
Internet memes introduced in 2022
Fictional currencies
TikTok